Libertia ixioides (mānga-a-Huripapa, mikoikoi or tūkāuki) is a flowering plant in the family Iridaceae. The species is endemic to New Zealand. It is a  rhizome-forming herbaceous perennial. The Latin ixioides means like an ixia, due to its similarities with that plant species.

Habitat
Libertia ixioides is common from coastal through to montane environments, and is especially common on ridges, cliffs, gullies, river banks, coastal cliffs, and upland forest. It has been recorded as epiphytic in some northern sites.

Cultivation
Libertia ixioides has become common in recent years in 'modern', low maintenance gardens due to its ordered, colourful foliage. Several cultivars have been introduced to the market, including:
 Libertia ixioides 'Gold Finger' - a cultivar that tolerates sun and dry better than the usual L. ixioides. Needs to have sun to keep colour.
 Libertia ixioides 'Highlander' - attractive year round display of gold seed pods. Green leaves with gold ribs.
 Libertia ixioides 'Taupo Blaze' - a cultivar that changes leaf colour in autumn/winter from green through to orange/yellow and deep red.
 Libertia ixioides 'Taupo Sunset' - a cultivar with narrow flax-like leaves, green with red stripe on edges.

References

ixioides
Flora of New Zealand
Endemic flora of New Zealand